Hanover is a census-designated place  in Grant County, New Mexico, United States. Its population was 167 as of the 2010 census. Hanover has a post office with ZIP code 88041. New Mexico State Road 152 and  New Mexico State Road 356 pass through the community. The town was named after the local Hanover Mines. Sofio Henkel, one of the original settlers, came from Hanover, Germany, in 1841 and mined until 1843, when he was driven away by Apaches.

Demographics

References

Census-designated places in New Mexico
Census-designated places in Grant County, New Mexico